Kolasla (Vidhan Sabha constituency) was one of the 425 Vidhan Sabha (Legislative Assembly) constituencies of Uttar Pradesh state in central India.  It was a part of the Varanasi district and one of the assembly constituencies in the Varanasi Lok Sabha constituency. Kolasla Assembly constituency came into existence in 1962 and ceased to exist in 2008 as a result of "Delimitation of Parliamentary and Assembly Constituencies Order, 2008".

Member of Legislative Assembly

 1952:Sri Devmurti Sharma,Congress
 1962: Udal, Communist Party of India
 1967: Udal,  Communist Party of India (Marxist)
 1969: Amar Nath Dubey, Indian National Congress
 1974: Udal,  Communist Party of India (Marxist)
 1977: Udal,  Communist Party of India (Marxist)
 1980: Udal,  Communist Party of India (Marxist)
 1985: Ramkaran Patel, Indian National Congress
 1989: Udal,  Communist Party of India (Marxist)
 1991: Udal,  Communist Party of India (Marxist)
 1993: Udal,  Communist Party of India (Marxist)
 1996: Ajay Rai, Bharatiya Janata Party
 2002: Ajay Rai, Bharatiya Janata Party
 2007: Ajay Rai, Bharatiya Janata Party Ajay Rai, 
 2009 (By Polls): Ajay Rai , Independent

See also

 Varanasi
 Varanasi (Lok Sabha constituency)

References

Politics of Varanasi district
Former assembly constituencies of Uttar Pradesh